Wildwood House may refer to:

Places
in the United States (by state)
Wildwood Farm, Skylight, KY, listed on the NRHP in Oldham County, Kentucky
Wildwood Plantation House, Jackson, Louisiana, listed on the NRHP in East Feliciana Parish, Louisiana
Wildwood House (Ferguson, Missouri), listed on the NRHP in St. Louis County, Missouri
Wildwood Cottage, Harrisville, New Hampshire, listed on the NRHP in Cheshire County, New Hampshire
Wildwood Hall, Newbury, Vermont, listed on the NRHP in Orange County, Vermont

Publisher
Wildwood House (publisher), a London-based publishing house

See also
Wildwood (disambiguation)